Roads (also known as Rhoads) is an unincorporated community in Carroll County, in the U.S. state of Missouri.

History
A post office called Roads was established in 1883, and remained in operation until 1907. The community derives its name from A. F. Rhoads, an early citizen.

References

Unincorporated communities in Carroll County, Missouri
Unincorporated communities in Missouri